The politics of Jiangsu Province in the People's Republic of China is structured in a dual party-government system like all other governing institutions in mainland China.

The Governor of Jiangsu is the highest-ranking official in the People's Government of Jiangsu. However, in the province's dual party-government governing system, the Governor has less power than the Jiangsu Chinese Communist Party Provincial Committee Secretary, colloquially termed the "Jiangsu CCP Party Chief".

List of the CCP Jiangsu Committee secretaries
Ke Qingshi: 1952–1954 
Jiang Weiqing: 1954–1967
Xu Shiyou: 1970–1973
Peng Chong: 1974–1977
Xu Jiatun: 1977–1983 
Han Peixin: 1983–1989 
Shen Daren: 1989–1993 
Chen Huanyou: 1993–2000 
Hui Liangyu: 2000–2002 
Li Yuanchao: 2002–2007 
Liang Baohua: 2007–2010
Luo Zhijun: 2010–2016
Li Qiang: 2016–2017
Lou Qinjian: 2017–2021
Wu Zhenglong (吴政隆): 2021-present

List of the governors of Jiangsu
Tan Zhenlin: 1952–1955 
Hui Yuyu: 1955–1967 
Xu Shiyou: 1968–1973  
Peng Chong: 1974–1977  
Xu Jiatun: 1977–1979 
Hui Yuyu: 1979–1982 
Han Peixin: 1982–1983  
Gu Xiulian: 1983–1989
Chen Huanyou: 1989–1994
Zheng Silin: 1994–1998
Ji Yunshi: 1998–2002
Liang Baohua: 2002 – January 2008
Luo Zhijun: January 2008 – December 2010
Li Xueyong: December 2010 – November 2015
Shi Taifeng: November 2015 – April 2017
Wu Zhenglong: April 2017 – October 2021
Xu Kunlin (许昆林): October 2021 - present

List of the chairmen of Jiangsu People's Congress
Xu Jiatun: 1979–1983
Chu Jiang: 1983–1988
Han Peixin: 1988–1993
Shen Daren: 1993–1998
Chen Huanyou: 1998–2003
Li Yuanchao: 2003–2007 
Wang Shouting: 2007–2008 (acting)
Liang Baohua: 2008–2011
Luo Zhijun: 2011–2022
Wu Zhenglong (吴政隆): 2022 - present

List of the chairmen of CPPCC Jiangsu Committee
Jiang Weiqing: 1955–1967
Xu Jiatun: 1977–1979
Hui Yuyu: 1979
Bao Houchang: 1979–1983
Qian Zhonghan: 1983–1989
Sun Han: 1989–1998
Cao Keming: 1998–2003
Xu Zhonglin: 2003–2007
Zhang Lianzhen: 2007–2017
Jiang Dingzhi (蒋定之): 2017–2018
Huang Lixin (黄莉新): 2018 - 2022
Zhang Yizhen (张义珍): 2022 - present

Qing dynasty
Under the Qing dynasty, the governor (巡撫, xunfu) of Jiangsu was the highest-ranking official within Jiangsu but reported to the Viceroy of Liangjiang, who was often involved in provincial affairs. Additionally, the taotais of the treaty ports were often quite autonomous and exercised a great deal of influence through their direct involvement with foreign officials and the income from international trade.

Li Hongzhang
...
Wu Yuanping

Jiangsu
Jiangsu
Jiangsu